Look for the Silver Lining is a 1949 American biographical musical film directed by David Butler and written by Phoebe Ephron, Henry Ephron and Marian Spitzer. A biography of Broadway singer-dancer Marilyn Miller, it stars June Haver and Ray Bolger. It was nominated for an Academy Award for best scoring for a musical picture in 1950.

Although the film was popular and made a profit, Haver's performance of Marilyn Miller has been somewhat overlooked in comparison to the more memorable portrayal of Miller by Judy Garland in Till the Clouds Roll By, the 1946 MGM musical biography of the composer Jerome Kern. The film was released by Warner Bros. on July 30, 1949.

Plot

Ohio girl Marilyn Miller ends up joining the vaudeville act of her family, even though she is underage. Her idol, the dancer Jack Donahue, helps her career, as does new dance partner Frank Carter, who elopes with Marilyn after he returns home from World War I.

Frank is killed in a car crash. Marilyn no longer wishes to perform, but changes her mind at the urging of Jack and a New York impresario, Henry Doran, who also persuades Marilyn to marry him. Marilyn returns to the stage, but after a dizzy spell causes her to collapse, she acknowledges that she's been advised by doctors to slow down at the risk of her health. Marilyn insists that, without performing, her life would feel meaningless.

Cast
June Haver as Marilyn Miller
Ray Bolger as Jack Donahue
Gordon MacRae as Frank Carter 
Charlie Ruggles as Caro "Pop" Miller  
Rosemary DeCamp as Mama Miller
Lee and Lyn Wilde as Claire and Ruth Miller
Dick Simmons as Henry Doran
S. Z. Sakall as Shendorf
Walter Catlett as himself
George Zoritch as Ballet Specialty
Will Rogers Jr. as  Will Rogers
Lillian Yarbo as Violet (uncredited)

Reception

Box office
According to Warner Bros. records, the film earned $3,089,000 domestically and $1,041,000 foreign.

References

External links
 
 

1949 films
Films directed by David Butler
Films scored by David Buttolph
American biographical films
Biographical films about singers
Biographical films about musicians
Warner Bros. films
Cultural depictions of Will Rogers
1940s biographical films
Films scored by Ray Heindorf
1940s American films